WMML (1230 AM) is a radio station broadcasting a classic country format. Licensed to Glens Falls, New York, United States, the station serves the Glens Falls area.  Established in 1959 as WSET, the station is owned by Pamal Broadcasting, through licensee 6 Johnson Road Licenses, Inc.

History
What is now WMML began operations in 1959 as WSET, programming a middle of the road format; for a time, the station studios were located in the Queensbury Hotel in Glens Falls. In 1965, WSET changed its call letters to WBZA; the new call letters arose from the station owner's respect for WBZ in Boston. At the time, the station broadcast at 1410 AM with a "daytime only" license from the Federal Communications Commission (FCC).  At sunset each day, the station would leave the air until the next day at 6 a.m. In 1971, the format was changed to Top 40. During the later 1970s, WBZA evolved to more of an adult contemporary format, and it eventually changed frequencies to 1230 in late 1982. WBZA flipped formats in 1986 to nostalgia, calling itself "Real Music". The WBZA call letters were transferred 1410 AM (which had returned to the air in 1988 under a new license as WSTL) in 1998; at that time, the station changed its call letters to WMML and took on a sports format.

The station signed off the air in early 2012 to build a new antenna and returned to the air in March.  It was announced, when the station signed back on March 15, that WMML would be joining the New York Mets Radio Network, covering all 162 games, replacing WOFX, who decided to switch to the Boston Red Sox Radio Network for the 2012 season.

On March 9, 2023, WMML/W250CC flipped to classic country, assuming the format and branding of WKBE, as "Big Country 97.9"; this is intended to make room for a new format to debut on WKBE at a yet-undetermined time.

References

External links

MML
Country radio stations in the United States
Pamal Broadcasting
Radio stations established in 1959
1959 establishments in New York (state)
Fox Sports Radio stations